Golden Web is a Ghanaian food company. They are listed on the stock index of the Ghana Stock Exchange, the GSE All-Share Index. It formed on May 5, 1982.

Operations
Golden Web Ltd. processes vegetable oil. The Company produces and markets palm kernels, soya beans, oils and cakes.

References

External links

Food and drink companies of Ghana
Manufacturing companies of Ghana
Food and drink companies established in 1982
Manufacturing companies established in 1982
1982 establishments in Ghana
Companies listed on the Ghana Stock Exchange
Kumasi